Trouble is a 1922 American silent comedy-drama film directed by Albert Austin and written by Max Abramson. The film stars Jackie Coogan, Wallace Beery, and Gloria Hope. The film was released on August 7, 1922, by Associated First National Pictures.

Plot
As described in a film magazine, Danny (Coogan) is a kid at a private orphanage where he is beset with much grief in his attempts to prevent the sending away of his pet dog. The orphanage is to be abandoned and its little charges are offered for adoption. Danny finds a new home but it is far from an ideal home. The wife-beating husband Ed Lee (Beery) is finally put where he can work off his excess energy on a rock pile, while Danny, his foster mother (Hope), and her parents repair to an old farmhouse in the country where all is well.

Cast
Jackie Coogan as Danny, the Kid
Wallace Beery as Ed Lee, the Plumber
Gloria Hope as Mrs. Lee, the Plumber's Wife
Queenie the Dog as herself
Valentine Black as Girl (uncredited)
Tom Wilson (uncredited)

Preservation
Prints of Trouble exists at Gosfilmofond in Russia and EYE Film Institute Netherlands.

References

External links

1922 comedy-drama films
1922 films
American silent feature films
American black-and-white films
First National Pictures films
Films produced by Sol Lesser
Films directed by Albert Austin
1920s American films
Silent American comedy-drama films
1920s English-language films